Jaron is a given name and surname.  Notable people with the name include:

Given name
Jaron Blossomgame (born 1993), American basketball player in the Israeli Basketball Premier League
Jaron Brown (born 1990), American football wide receiver for the Arizona Cardinals of the National Football League (NFL)
JaRon Harris (born 1986), former American football wide receiver
Jaron Johnson (born 1992), American professional basketball player for the Rio Grande Valley Vipers of the NBA Development League
Jaron Lanier (born 1960), American computer philosophy writer, computer scientist, visual artist, and composer of classical music
Jaron Long (born 1991), American professional baseball pitcher with the Washington Nationals organization
Jaron Lowenstein (born 1974), American singer, recorded with his identical twin brother Evan in the musical duo Evan and Jaron
Jaron Marquis (born 1983), American hip-hop musician based in Indianapolis, Indiana
JaRon Rush (born 1979), retired American professional basketball small forward from Kansas City, Missouri
Jaron Schäfer (born 1993), German footballer
Ja'Ron Smith, American White House aide
Jaron Soininen of Universum, a heavy metal band from Adelaide, South Australia
Jaron Bourdot of small town Rangiora. Failed post high school basketball career, turned to a career making money by all means necessary.

Surname
Dov Jaron, American engineer
Damian Jaroń (born 1990), Polish footballer

See also
Jaren (given name)
Jarron, given name
Yaron
Jaron Cliffs, a line of steep, snow-covered cliffs on the south side of Mount Takahe, in Marie Byrd Land, Antarctica
Aron (disambiguation)
Jaro (disambiguation)
Jaronty

de:Jaron